The Federal Correctional Institution, Aliceville (FCI Aliceville) is a low security United States federal prison for female inmates in Alabama. It is operated by the Federal Bureau of Prisons, a division of the United States Department of Justice. It also includes a satellite prison camp for minimum-security female inmates. FCI Aliceville is located in unincorporated Pickens County, between Aliceville and Pickensville.

It is the first federal women's prison to be established in Alabama.

History
Construction on FCI Aliceville began in 2008.

FCI Aliceville became operational in 2013. Aliceville public officials approved the project with the support of residents who hope that the facility would provide jobs and boost local businesses. The town's population is about 2,500, with unemployment near 11 percent, well above the national average. Aliceville officials estimate the facility will generate between 700 and 1,000 trips per day, which will lead to new hotels, restaurants and gas stations being opened. The medium-security prison is expected to house 1,400 female inmates and employ between 320 and 350 people when it reaches full operating capacity. However, 40 percent of those jobs will go to existing federal prison employees.  The Bureau of Prisons has already transferred female inmates to FCI Aliceville from FCI Danbury, which is being converted back to an all-male facility.

Pickens County, previously losing population, became the fastest growing county in Alabama in 2014 because of the installation of the prison.

On February 2, 2016, a tornado caused damage at the prison facility, the extent of which is currently unknown.

Location and facility
The prison is on a  plot of land along Alabama State Route 14, in southwest unincorporated Pickens County. The local area is served by the Aliceville post office.

The prison, managed by two construction companies, had a scheduled cost of $185 million. Caddell and W.G. Yates & Sons, of Montgomery, Alabama and Philadelphia, Mississippi, respectively, worked on the project.

Programs and services
FCI Aliceville offers a literacy program designed to help inmates develop foundational knowledge and skills in reading, math, written expression, and to prepare inmates for GED classes. Inmates with low-English proficiency are required to take ESL classes. Adult continuing education, college correspondence programs and parenting classes are also available. A Release Preparation Program is geared towards preparing inmates for their return to society. Inmate tutors teach skills including job searching, resume writing, budgeting and buying a home.

Notable inmates (current and former)

See also

 List of U.S. federal prisons
 Federal Bureau of Prisons
 Incarceration of women in the United States

References

External links
 FCI Aliceville

2013 establishments in Alabama
Buildings and structures in Pickens County, Alabama
Aliceville
Prisons in Alabama